The 11th FINA World Swimming Championships (25m) was held in Istanbul, Turkey on 12–16 December 2012. This swimming-only championships took place in the Sinan Erdem Dome; all events were swum in a 25-meter (short-course) pool.

The United States topped the medal standings with a total of 27 medals and had the most gold medals with 11. A total of 18 championship records were set and 2 world records (both set by American Ryan Lochte) broken.  Lochte and Hungarian Katinka Hosszú were named the best male and female swimmers of the competition. Lochte finished the meet with 8 total medals (breaking his previous record of 7 set in 2010) and Hosszú had 5 total medals.

Bidding process

FINA announced on 12 April 2008 that Istanbul had defeated the only other bidder Vienna, Austria after a meeting of the FINA Bureau in Manchester, UK.

Venue

The events took place at the Sinan Erdem Dome, which has a seating capacity of 22,500.

Events 
The swimming competition featured races in a short course (25 m) pool in 40 events (20 for males, 20 for females; 17 individual events and 3 relays for each gender).  Prelim events were held in the morning session and semi-finals/final events were held in the evening session.
Freestyle: 50, 100, 200, 400, 800 (women), and 1,500 (men);
Backstroke: 50, 100, and 200;
Breaststroke: 50, 100, and 200;
Butterfly: 50, 100, and 200;
Individual medley: 100, 200, and 400;
Relays: 4 × 100 free, 4 × 200 free; 4 × 100 medley

Schedule

Medal summary

Changes in medal standings

In June 2013, Danish swimmer Mads Glæsner was stripped by FINA of a gold and bronze medal from the 400- and 1500-meter freestyle after testing positive for levomethamphetamine.

In January 2014 the Court of Arbitration for Sport partially overturned FINA's ruling and returned the gold medal in 1500 m freestyle.

Results

Men's events

 Swimmers who participated in the heats only and received medals.

Women's events

 Swimmers who participated in the heats only and received medals.

Championship and world records broken

Men

Women 

All world records (WR) are subsequently championship records (CR).
 Morozov broke the championship record in the 100 m freestyle as the lead-off leg in the 4×100 m freestyle relay.

Broadcasting rights 
 Europe – Eurosport
 Finland – Yle
 Hungary – M2; Kossuth Rádió
 Lithuania – LRT televizija
 Turkey – TRT SPOR

Participating nations
161 nations entered the competition. Ecuador, currently suspended by FINA due to government interference, participated under the FINA flag. Venezuela later withdrew.

References

External links
 Official website 
 Competition results

 
FINA World Swimming Championships (25 m)
S
International aquatics competitions hosted by Turkey
2012 in Turkish sport
Swimming competitions in Turkey
FINA World Swimming Championships (25 m)
December 2012 sports events in Turkey
2012 in Istanbul
Sports competitions in Istanbul
Sport in Bakırköy